Moh. Amin Sheikho was a Syrian scholar and interpreter of the Quran born in 1890 CE / 1308 AH.

Early life and education 
Sheikho was born at al-Ward district of the Sarouja Quarter in Damascus, Syria. He was raised in an Arab-styled house situated opposite the public al-Ward Bath house,  which still stand today. 

Sheikho was still young when his father, the merchant Ismael Sheikho, died. Mohammad Saleem, the elder and only brother of Mohammad Amin, was appointed as the director of the Military School during the Ottoman rule.

At the age of twelve, he was enrolled at the al-Rashidiya School. He then went on to complete his studies in Amber, the Royal Ottoman Faculty in Damascus.

Career

Public administration 
During the period of Turkish rule, he was head of many police-stations in Damascus and its dependent counties. During the French Mandate for Syria and Lebanon he was appointed a director of the prisons of the citadel of Damascus.

When the Great Syrian Revolt took place against the French forces, he helped the Syrian revolutionaries in their attempts to overthrow French rule. Due to his subversive activities the French governor of Syria issued an order for his execution.

Academic career 
He was the companion of Sheikh Mohammed Amin Kuftaro for almost twenty years, and following his death Sheikho became the next in succession to guide and teach the disciples of the eminent sheikh.

In 1953, philosopher Sir John Godolphin Bennett came from Britain to visit him. He remained in his company for three weeks that were filled with lengthy dialogues about Islam. Bennett asked Sheikho many questions about the exact definition of the ‘spirit’ and the difference between that and the ‘soul’, as well as asking for clarification about Godly Justice, a topic which he found difficult to comprehend. As a result of this visit, Bennett practiced Islamic legislation and performed the prayers along with the followers of Mohammad Amin Sheikho.

Publications 
Mohammad Amin Sheikho dictated to his pupils many books about Islam in the Arabic language, some of which have been translated into English and French.

 The Envoy of Peace Looms on the Horizon: the Return of Jesus Christ.

References 

Quranic exegesis scholars
People from Damascus
1890 births
1964 deaths